Century City station may refer to:

 Century City/Constellation station, Los Angeles, California, U.S.
 Qianjiang Century City station, Hangzhou, Zhejiang province, China
 Century City station (Chengdu Metro), Sichuan, China